Anne-Marie Paule Monique Huby (born November 1966) is a Belgian businesswoman, the co-founder, with Zarine Kharas, of Justgiving, a global online giving platform.

Huby started her career as a radio journalist in Belgium, before becoming head of the UK arm of the charity Médecins Sans Frontières.

Huby and Kharas founded Justgiving in 2000.

References

1966 births
Living people
Belgian businesspeople
Belgian women journalists
Belgian radio journalists
Belgian women radio journalists
Women founders
Date of birth missing (living people)
Place of birth missing (living people)
20th-century Belgian women